Patangrao Kadam (8 January 1944 – 9 March 2018) was an Indian politician from the state of Maharashtra. He came from a middle level farmer family in a small village, Sonsal in Sangli district. He previously held the forest ministry in the Maharashtra government. He was also an educationist and was the founder of Bharati Vidyapeeth. Kadam died of renal dysfunction at Mumbai's Lilavati Hospital on 9 March 2018.

Early life
Patangrao Kadam was born into a middle-level farming family in a small village of Sonsal, Sangli District in Maharashtra. Since no educational facilities were available in Sonsal, Kadam had to walk 4–5 km every day to attend a primary school in a nearby village. He did his secondary education up to S.S.C. at a boarding school in Kundal.

Kadam was the first person from his village to have passed the S.S.C. examination. After S.S.C., he joined Shivaji College, Satara, run by Rayat Shikshan Sanstha, which was established by a renowned social reformer and educationist, Karmaveer Bhaurao Patil. He was enrolled in the College under its "earn and learn scheme". He took lessons of dedicated social service from Karmaveer Bhaurao Patil.

Kadam came to Pune in 1961, where he completed a one-year Diploma Course in teaching in 1962, and started working as a part-time teacher in a secondary school in Pune run by Rayat Shikshan Sanstha. Kadam obtained a bachelor's degree in Law and master's degree from the University of Pune. Despite his preoccupation with educational, social and political activities, Kadam completed his research on the theme "Administrative Problems of Educational Administration in 80s" for which he was awarded a Ph.D. in Management by the University of Pune. He has also established Milk Society, Spinning Mills, Sugar Factories, a Bank etc.

Death
After prolonged illness caused by renal dysfunction, Patangrao died at Mumbai's Lilavati Hospital on 9 March 2018.

References

Marathi politicians
1944 births
2018 deaths
Indian National Congress politicians
Maharashtra MLAs 2009–2014
People from Sangli district
Maharashtra MLAs 2014–2019
Deaths from kidney disease